Vaccinium sikkimense is a species of flowering plant in the family Ericaceae, native to South-Central China, East Himalaya, Myanmar, Nepal and Tibet. It was first described by Charles Baron Clarke in 1882. It may only be a dwarf alpine form of Vaccinium glaucoalbum.

Description
Its leaves are hairless and somewhat leathery, about 25 mm long and pointed oval in shape. They are densely arranged on the stems. The pink flowers are produced in axilliary and terminal clusters in July. The clusters have pink bracts. The corolla is about 5 mm long. The blue-black fruits ripen in August and September and have been recorded as "excellent eating".

Taxonomy
Vaccinium sikkimense was first collected by Joseph Dalton Hooker in Lachen, Sikkim, and described for science by Charles Baron Clarke in the third volume of Hooker's Flora of British India, published in 1882. In the same work, Clarke also described Vaccinium glaucoalbum (attributing the name to Hooker). Some sources agree this is a separate species, while others treat it as the accepted name for V. sikkimense. V. sikkimense may only be the dwarfed alpine form of V. glaucoalbum.

Cultivation
The species was collected by several of the early pioneers of botanical collecting in the Himalayas, including George Forrest, Joseph Rock and Frank Kingdon-Ward. Of these, only Kingdon-Ward appears to have introduced living material to cultivation, in 1931 and 1953. It was collected again and brought into cultivation in 1981, by Tony Schilling. A hardy ornamental shrub, it remains rare in cultivation, although grown in public gardens in several parts of Great Britain.

Distribution and habitat
Vaccinium sikkimense is distributed from the eastern Himalayas, through northeast Nepal and southeast Tibet into west South-Central China and northwest Myanmar (Burma). It has not been recorded from either Bhutan or Arunachal Pradesh, giving it a disjunct distribution.

References

sikkimense
Flora of South-Central China
Flora of East Himalaya
Flora of Nepal
Flora of Myanmar
Flora of Tibet
Plants described in 1882